Now That's What I Call Music! 48, released on November 11, 2013, is the 48th edition of the Now! series in the United States. The album features two songs which reached number one on the US Billboard Hot 100: "Roar" and "Blurred Lines".

Now 48 debuted at No. 3 on the Billboard 200 albums chart with first-week sales of 114,000 copies. It is the first album in the series to top 100,000 units in a week since Now 43 did so in its debut week in August 2012.

Track listing

References

External links

2013 compilation albums
 048
Universal Music Enterprises compilation albums